Catherine Hyde may refer to:

 Catherine Ryan Hyde (born 1955), American novelist and short story writer
Catherine Hyde, Duchess of Queensbury (1701-1777), English socialite